Avicenne Hospital is an Islamic hospital in Bobigny, Seine-Saint-Denis, in the northern suburbs of Paris. Opened in 1935 as the Franco-Muslim Hospital (Hôpital franco-musulman de Paris), it was built specifically to cater for North-African immigrants who had flocked to the Paris area. Renamed Avicenne in 1978, in memory of the Persian physician Avicenna, it is now a university hospital catering for the local population.

References

Hospitals in Île-de-France
Teaching hospitals in France
Hospital buildings completed in 1935
Hospitals established in 1935
Islam in Paris
North African diaspora in Paris
Avicenna